Alkaline Trio is a compilation album by American rock band of the same name, released April 18, 2000 through Asian Man Records. It includes all of the tracks from their EPs For Your Lungs Only (1998) and I Lied My Face Off (1999), as well as both tracks from the "Sundials" single (1997) and several tracks from other compilations.

Reception 

By August 2008, the album sold 85,000 copies. Ari Wiznitzer of Allmusic praised the compilation, comparing the songs' lyrics to those of Blake Schwarzenbach and saying that "What separates this record from most compilations of its kind is both consistency and excellent sequencing. This is the band's best batch of songs since Goddamnit, and although taken from disparate sources, the record has the feel of a long-player."

Track listing

Personnel 
 Matt Skiba – guitar, lead vocals
 Dan Andriano – bass, backing vocals (tracks 1–10)
 Rob Doran – bass (tracks 11–13)
 Glenn Porter – drums

References

External links

Alkaline Trio at YouTube (streamed copy where licensed)

Alkaline Trio albums
2000 compilation albums
Asian Man Records compilation albums
B-side compilation albums